Wuchang Subdistrict (五常街道) is a subdistrict of Yuhang District, Hangzhou, Zhejiang, China.

References 

Township-level divisions of Zhejiang
Subdistricts of the People's Republic of China
Yuhang District